The Roman Catholic Archdiocese of Mohilev (or Mogilev or Mahilyow) was a territorial Latin rite division of the Roman Catholic Church, covering a significant western proportion of the territory of the Tsarist Russian empire.

History 
It was erected as Diocese of Mohilev in 1772 by the Russian empress Catherine the Great, in a unilateral action independent of Rome. Its territory was split off from the Dioceses of Inflanty and Smolensk. Its initial see was the imperial capital city Saint Petersburg.

In 1782 Catherine elevated the diocese to non-Metropolitan Archdiocese of Mohilev, and in 1783 these actions were recognised by Pope Pius VI in the bull Onerosa pastoralis officii.

On 9 August 1798, it lost territory to establish the Diocese of Minsk (in Belarus); the same year it was raised to Metropolitan Archdiocese of Mohilev. The archdiocese remained the Latin Metropolitan see for Russia throughout imperial times and the Soviet period, although for much of the latter period it was the subject of repression and had no incumbent archbishop.

In 1818 it gained territory from the suppressed Diocese of Smolensk.

It repeatedly lost territory, to establish successively the Cherson on 3 July 1848, the Apostolic Exarchate of Russia in 1917, the Diocese of Riga on 22 September 1918, the Apostolic Vicariate of Finland on 8 June 1920 and the Apostolic Vicariate of Siberia on 1 December 1921.

It was suppressed on 13 April 1991. Mogilev is a city in present-day Belarus, and with the demise of the Soviet Union the Archdiocese's territory and title were merged into its former daughter-suffragan of Minsk (which had often been governed ad interim by its Metropolitan, as Apostolic administrator), in the newly independent country's capital, to create the Roman Catholic Archdiocese of Minsk-Mohilev. The territorial boundaries of the new archdiocese were redrawn to include only territory within Belarus. Territories of the former archdiocese falling within present-day Russia were reassigned, first to the Apostolic Administration of European Russia, and subsequently to what are now the Archdiocese of Mother of God at Moscow in the north and the Diocese of Saint Clement at Saratov in the south.

Episcopal ordinaries
All Latin, Roman Rite.

Suffragan Bishops of Mohilev

Metropolitan Archbishops of Mohilev 
1783–1826: Stanisław Bohusz Siestrzeńcewicz, previously Titular Bishop of Mallus (1773.07.12 – 1783.12.11), Auxiliary Bishop of Vilnius (Lithuania) (1773.07.12 – 1783.12.11)
1828–1831: Kasper Cieciszowski, previously Titular Bishop of Theveste (1775.05.29 – 1784.08.07), Coadjutor Bishop of Kyiv–Černihiv (Ukraine) (1775.05.29 – 1784.08.07), succeeding as Bishop of Kyiv–Černihiv (1784.08.07 – 1798.11.17), Bishop of Lutsk and Zytomierz (Ukraine) (1798.11.17 – 1828.06.23)
1841: Ignacy Pawłowski, previously Titular Bishop of Megara (1828.06.23 – 1841.03.01), Auxiliary Bishop of Kamyanets-Podilsky (Ukraine) (1828.06.23 – 1841.03.01)
1849–1851: Kazimierz Dmochowski, previously Auxiliary Bishop of Vilnius (Lithuania) (1840.12.17 – 1848.07.03), Titular Bishop of Meloë in Lycia (1840.12.17 – 1849.07.17), Auxiliary Bishop of Žemaitija (Lithuania) (1848.07.03 – 1849.07.17)
1851–1855: Ignacy Hołowiński, succeeding as previous Titular Bishop of Carystus & Coadjutor Archbishop of Mohilev (1848.07.03 – 1851.01.24)
1856–1863: Wacław Żyliński, previously Bishop of Vilnius (Lithuania) (1848.07.03 – 1856.10.27)
1872–1883: Antoni Fijałkowski, previously Titular Bishop of Tanasia & Auxiliary Bishop of Kamyanets-Podilsky (Ukraine) (1858.06.25 – 1860.03.23), succeeding as Bishop of Kamyanets-Podilsky (1860.03.23 – 1872.02.23); also Apostolic Administrator of Minsk (Belarus) (1872.02.23 – 1883.02.11)
1883–1889: Aleksander Gintowt-Dziewałtowski, previously Bishop of Lutsk and Zytomierz (Ukraine) (1883.03.15 – 1891.12.14) and Apostolic Administrator of Kamyanets-Podilsky (Ukraine) (1883.03.15 – 1891.12.14); also Apostolic Administrator of Minsk (Belarus) (1891.12.14 – 1899.11.26)
1891–1899: Szymon Marcin Kozłowski, previously Bishop of Lutsk and Zytomierz (Ukraine) (1883.03.15 – 1891.12.14), Apostolic Administrator of Kamyanets-Podilsky (Ukraine) (1883.03.15 – 1891.12.14); also Apostolic Administrator of Minsk (Belarus) (1891.12.14 – 1899.11.26)
1901–1903: Bolesław Hieronim Kłopotowski, previously Titular Bishop of Eleutheropolis (1897.08.02 – 1899.12.14), Auxiliary Bishop of Lutsk and Zytomierz (Ukraine) (1897.08.02 – 1899.12.14), then Bishop of Lutsk and Zytomierz (Ukraine) (1899.12.14 – 1901.04.15), Apostolic Administrator of Kamyanets-Podilsky (Ukraine) (1899.12.14 – 1901.04.15); also Apostolic Administrator of Minsk (Belarus) (1901.04.15 – 1903.02.24)
1903–1905: Jerzy Szembek, previously Bishop of Płock (Poland) (1901.04.15 – 1903.11.09); also Apostolic Administrator of Minsk (Belarus) (1903.11.09 – 1905.08.07)
1908–1909: Apolinary Wnukowski, previously Bishop of Płock (Poland) (1904.04.01 – 1908.11.29); also Apostolic Administrator of Minsk (Belarus) (1908.11.29 – 1909.06.04)
1910–1914: ; also Apostolic Administrator of Minsk (Belarus) (1910.04.07 – 1914.09.22); later Titular Archbishop of Philippopolis (modern (Sofia and) Plovdiv, Bulgaria) (1914.09.22 – 1917.02.23)
1917–1926: Eduard von der Ropp, previously Bishop of Tiraspol (Moldova) (1902.06.09 – 1903.11.09), Bishop of Vilnius (Lithuania) (1903.11.09 – 1917.07.25); also Apostolic Administrator of Vilnius (Lithuania) (1917.07.25 – 1918.10.23)
1923.07.05 – 1925.12.14 Jan Feliks Cieplak, as Apostolic Administrator; previously Titular Bishop of Evaria (1908.07.12 – 1919.03.28), Auxiliary Bishop of Mohilev (Belarus) (1908.07.12 – 1925.12.14), Titular Archbishop of Acrida (Epirus) (1919.03.28 – 1925.12.14); later Metropolitan Archbishop of Vilnius (Lithuania) (1925.12.14 – 1926.02.17)
1926–1981: Boļeslavs Sloskāns, as Apostolic administrator, also Titular Bishop of Cillium (1926.05.05 – 1981.04.18); also Apostolic Administrator of Minsk (Belarus) (1926.08.13 – 1981.04.18).

See also 
 Roman Catholicism in Russia

References

Sources and external links 
 GCatholic.org, with incumbent biography links
 Catholic Hierarchy

Former Roman Catholic dioceses in Ex-Soviet Europe
Roman Catholic dioceses in Belarus
Roman Catholic dioceses and prelatures established in the 18th century
1772 establishments in the Russian Empire